Kadi may refer to:

Radio
KADI-FM, a radio station (99.5 FM) licensed to serve Republic, Missouri, United States
KICK (AM), a radio station (1340 AM) licensed to serve Springfield, Missouri, which held the call sign KADI from 2005 to 2015
WFUN-FM, a radio station (96.3 FM) licensed to serve St. Louis, Missouri, which held the call sign KADI from 1983 to 1987
KSIV (AM), a radio station (1320 AM) licensed to serve Clayton, Missouri, which held the call sign KADI from 1975 to 1978 and 1979 to 1982
Raadio Kadi, a radio station in Estonia

Other
Kadi (name)
Kadi, India, a city and municipality in Mehsana district, Gujarat, India
Kadi, an aromatic plant (Pandanus odorifer)
Kadhi, an Indian dish
Kadı, an official in the Ottoman Empire
Qadi or kadi, Islamic judge
Al-Qadi, an Arabic surname
Qazi family of Lakhnauti, a medieval Bengali family
Quadi, an ancient Germanic tribe
Kadi I and Kadi II, two EU law cases involving Yassin Kadi

See also
Cadi (disambiguation)
Kati (disambiguation)
Kady